Intoxicated Lover is the debut Cantonese studio album by Hong Kong singer Kelly Chen. It was released on December 15, 1995, through Go East Entertainment Company Ltd/ Polygram Records in Hong Kong. Intoxicated Lover was characterized as a Brit Pop record that was under the influence of pop music from the early 1990s. This album includes a wide range of highly qualified songs which aren't easily found in other Hong Kong singer's debut album. And it successfully intermingles pop with elements of Trip hop, Dance-pop  and Acoustic music which had a great influence on The Music of Hong Kong at that time.

Before the debut album's release, Kelly had already established a substantial fanbase in Hong Kong because she was fashionable and distinctive for a newcomer, and her first Cantonese single from her first soundtrack album 《Whatever Will Be, Will Be (仙樂飄飄)》was a big hit which peaked at number 1 on Four Hong Kong Top 10 Singles Charts.

The album spawned three singles. Dance-pop  《It's none of your business (唔關你事)》 was released as the lead single from the project and peaked at number 2 on Hong Kong 903 Top 20 Singles. Subsequent single acoustic music《I don't want to let you go (誰願放手)》was a commercial success. It peaked at number 1 on Hong Kong 903 Top 20 Singles and number 2 on RTHK Top 10 Singles. Indie pop 《I will miss you (我會掛念你)》 was released as the final single. It was also a successful single that peaked at number 1 on Hong Kong 997 Top 10 Singles, number 3 on Hong Kong 903 Top 20 Singles, and number 7 on RTHK Top 10 Singles.

Please note that trip hop 《Intoxicated Lover (Distorted Affair)(醉迷情人(Distorted Affair))》was not a single from this album, it was a single from her first collaborative album 《Open Up The Sky (打開天空)》

Composition
Intoxicated Lover is a brit Pop record. It principally consists of British-style songs

Musically, the album drew inspiration from early 1990s British popular music such as brit pop and trip hop. It was predominantly influenced by Blur, Suede, Radiohead and Portishead.

Lyrically, the songs on Intoxicated Lover chiefly talk about love and romance.

Track listing

References

Kelly Chen albums
1995 albums